Sekou Mohamed Kaba (born 25 August 1990) is a Guinean-Canadian hurdler. He competed in the 110 metres hurdles event at the 2015 World Championships in Beijing reaching the semifinals.

His family emigrated to Ypsilanti, Michigan in 2001 while Kaba moved to Ottawa, Ontario, Canada, in 2007.

His personal bests are 13.43 seconds in the 110 metres hurdles (+1.9 m/s, Edmonton 2015) and 7.77 seconds in the 60 meters hurdles (New York 2015). In July 2016 he was named in Canada's Olympic team.

Competition record

References

External links
 Official website
 
 

1990 births
Living people
Canadian male hurdlers
Guinean emigrants to Canada
World Athletics Championships athletes for Canada
Athletes (track and field) at the 2015 Pan American Games
Athletes (track and field) at the 2016 Summer Olympics
Olympic track and field athletes of Canada
Black Canadian track and field athletes
Pan American Games track and field athletes for Canada